Carohamilia ophelia is a moth in the family Cossidae. It is found in Guatemala.

The wingspan is about 35 mm. The forewings are white with greyish transverse striae. There are a few brown irrorations at the inner margin, as well as a triangular fuscous brown spot on the base of the costal margin. The hindwings are white.

References

Natural History Museum Lepidoptera generic names catalog

Moths described in 1921
Zeuzerinae